On 27 April 2016, Islamic State in Libya ambushed a convoy consisting of an undisclosed number of Libyan GNA as well as foreign troops. A multi-national force of Britain's Special Boat Service personnel, Italian Marines from the San Marco Marine Brigade, and local soldiers loyal to the recognized Libyan Government of National Accord were travelling from the northwestern Libyan city of Misrata towards the city of Sirte when it was hit. The ambush continued until "Italian and French warplanes and attack helicopters intrevend" according to several intelligence websites.

Unconfirmed reports indicated that the convoy suffered casualties including several GNA soldiers captured or killed, and several Italian marines killed or wounded.

References 

Misrata
Second Libyan Civil War
April 2016 events in Africa
2016 in Libya